Crinopteryx is a monotypic genus of primitive monotrysian moths. Its sole species, Crinopteryx familiella, is endemic to Europe, where it is restricted to the Mediterranean region of France, Italy, the Iberian Peninsula and Sicily. Crinopteryx used to be classified in its own, monotypic family called Crinopterygidae, but the latter has been downgraded to a subfamily (Crinopteryginae) of the family Incurvariidae.

Crinopteryx familiella is a small moth, about 7 mm in wingspan, and its morphological characters are rather unusual for the superfamily Adeloidea. For example, the caterpillar bears a case (see also Coleophoridae, feeding on rockrose (Cistus shrubs) (Rosaceae) (Davis, 1999: 83), and especially Cistus salviifolius.

References

 Davis, D.R. (1999). The Monotrysian Heteroneura. Ch. 6, pp. 65–90 in Kristensen, N.P. (Ed.). Lepidoptera, Moths and Butterflies. Volume 1: Evolution, Systematics, and Biogeography. Handbuch der Zoologie. Eine Naturgeschichte der Stämme des Tierreiches / Handbook of Zoology. A Natural History of the phyla of the Animal Kingdom. Band / Volume IV Arthropoda: Insecta Teilband / Part 35: 491 pp. Walter de Gruyter, Berlin, New York.

External links
Tree of Life

Incurvariidae
Monotypic moth genera
Adeloidea genera
Moths described in 1871
Moths of Europe
Taxa named by Henri de Peyerimhoff